This is a list of Ethiopian films that are notable and internationally acclaimed.

Ethiopia